is a Japanese animator, character designer, and manga artist. He is noted for his work with Sunrise, having worked on Infinite Ryvius, s-CRY-ed, Gundam SEED, Gundam SEED Destiny and Fafner of the Azure. He was also the lead animator for Linebarrels of Iron.

Works

Anime

Video games

References 

 Book references

External links
 

Sunrise (company) people
Japanese animators
Japanese animated film directors
Anime character designers
Manga artists from Tokyo
People from Tokyo
1959 births
Living people